Abalmasov is a rural locality (a khutor) in Volokonovsky District, Belgorod Oblast, Russia. The population was 11 as of 2010. There is 1 street.

Geography 
Abalmasov is located 29 km northwest of Volokonovka (the district's administrative centre) by road. Tolmachev is the nearest rural locality.

References 

Rural localities in Volokonovsky District